The Dahomean religion was practiced by the Fon people of the Dahomey Kingdom. The kingdom existed until 1898 in what is now the country of Benin. People taken from Dahomey to the Caribbean used elements of the religion to form Vodou and other religions of the Afro-Caribbean diaspora.

Mawu and Lisa
Lisa (male) and Mawu (female), married twin siblings of Nana Buluku, are the creator spirits, occasionally combined as Mawu-Lisa, an androgynous spirit. Mawu-Lisa created the world and made it orderly, then made plants, animals, and humans; the entire process took four days.
The first day, Mawu-Lisa created the world and humanity;
The second day the earth was made suitable for human life;
On the third day, humans were given intellect, language, and the senses;
Finally, on the fourth day, mankind received the gift of technology.

Offspring-spirits of Mawu and Lisa
Gbadu
Da and Gu
Dan

Other spirits
 Agé
 Avrikiti
 Ayaba
 Egberun
 Fa
 Gleti
 Gu
 Legba
 Loko
 Nana
 Okanu
 Sakpata
 Sogbo
 Xevioso
 Zinsu and Zinsi
 Jo

See also
 West African Vodun

References

External links
 Vodoun Culture Haitian Vodoun as chronicled by native Haitians
 Baba Alawoye.com Baba'Awo Awoyinfa Ifaloju, showcasing Ifa using web media 2.0 (blogs, podcasting, video and photocasting)

Traditional African religions